Nambar may refer to:

 Dalbergia retusa, a plant species in the genus Dalbergia also known as Rosewood or Palisander

Nambar is a Mongolian personal name.
Notable people bearing this name include:
as proper name
as patronymic
 Nambaryn Enkhbayar (born 1958), Mongolian Prime Minister in 2000–2004, and President of Mongolia in 2005–2009